The Diocese of Melo is a Latin Church ecclesiastical territory or diocese Catholic church in Uruguay.

History
The diocese was erected in 1955, split off from the former diocese of Florida-Melo, and is a suffragan of the Archdiocese of Montevideo. Its see is at the Cathedral of Melo.

The current bishop is Pablo Alfonso Jourdán Alvariza, who was appointed in 2021.

Ordinaries
José Maria Cavallero † (20 Dec 1955 – 9 Jul 1960 Appointed, Bishop of Minas) 
Orestes Santiago Nuti Sanguinetti, S.D.B. † (9 Jul 1960 – 2 Jan 1962 Appointed, Bishop of Canelones) 
Roberto Reinaldo Cáceres González † (2 Jan 1962 – 23 Apr 1996 Retired) 
Nicolás Cotugno Fanizzi, S.D.B. (13 Jun 1996 – 4 Dec 1998 Appointed, Archbishop of Montevideo) 
Luis del Castillo Estrada, S.J. (21 Dec 1999 – 13 Jun 2009)
Heriberto Andrés Bodeant Fernández (13 Jun 2009 – 19 Mar 2021 Appointed, Bishop of Canelones)
Pablo Alfonso Jourdán Alvariza (15 Sep 2021 – present)

See also
List of churches in the Diocese of Melo
List of Roman Catholic dioceses in Uruguay

References

External links
 Blog "Dar y Comunicar"

Religion in Cerro Largo Department
Religion in Treinta y Tres Department
Melo
Melo
Christian organizations established in 1955
1955 establishments in Uruguay
Melo